Komsomolskoye is a rural locality (a selo) in Kizilyurtovsky District, Republic of Dagestan, Russia. The population was 6,983 as of 2010. There are 47 streets.

Nationalities 
Avars live there.

Geography 
Komsomolskoye is located 3 km southeast of Kizilyurt (the district's administrative centre) by road. Kizilyurt and Nizhny Chiryurt are the nearest rural localities.

References 

Rural localities in Kizilyurtovsky District